St Patrick's Athletic F.C. is an Irish association football club based in Inchicore, Dublin. Below is an incomplete list of all players to have made a competitive appearance for the club.

A 
James Abankwah
Chris Adamson
Joseph Anang
Vinny Arkins
Chris Armstrong
Serge Atakayi

B 
Jordi Balk
Gordon Banks
Keith Barker
Michael Barker
Paddy Barrett
Jack Bayly
Martin Bayly
David Bell
Chris Bennion
Robbie Benson
Ian Bermingham
Jarosław Białek
Tony Bird
Greg Bolger
Sam Bone
Gavin Boyne
Synan Braddish
Stephen Bradley
Austin Brady
Ray Brady
Leon Braithwaite
Lee Brandon
Gino Brazil
Killian Brennan
Ryan Brennan
Stephen Brennan
Anthony Breslin
Barry Bridges
Harry Brockbank
Nicky Broujos
Bobby Browne
Kenny Browne
Liam Buckley
Willie Burke
Jack Burkett
Darragh Burns
Conan Byrne
Damien Byrne
David Byrne
Des Byrne
Gareth Byrne
Jason Byrne
James Byrne
Jody Byrne
John Byrne
Kurtis Byrne
Neill Byrne
Paul Byrne (born 1972)
Paul Byrne (born 1986)
Sean Byrne
Stuart Byrne
Thomas Byrne

C 
Stephen Caffrey
Aaron Callaghan
Daniel Campbell
Dave Campbell
Noel Campbell
Achille Campion
Jake Carroll
Keith Carter
Conor Carty
Mark Casey
Ryan Casey
Brian Cash
Alan Cawley
David Cawley
James Chambers
Marco Chindea
Brendan Clarke
Dean Clarke
Jeff Clarke
Paul Cleary
Conor Clifford
Cian Coleman
Jimmy Collins
John Colrain
Dan Connor
Mick Cooke
Ryan Coombes
Kian Corbally
Dinny Corcoran
Kevin Cornwall
Anthony Costigan
Barry Cotter
Gareth Coughlan
Ronan Coughlan
Fergus Crawford
Patrick Cregg
Trevor Croly
Paul Crowley
George Cummins
Sam Curtis
Declan Cully

D 
Ian Daly
Clive Delaney
Gary Dempsey
Kevin Dempsey
Billy Dennehy
Darren Dennehy
Lee Desmond
Robbie Devereux
Daniel Dobbin
Pat Dolan
Paul Donnelly 
James Doona
Derek Doyle
Eoin Doyle
Keith Doyle
Kevin Doyle
Mark Doyle
Robbie Doyle
Mikey Drennan
Darragh Dunne
Jimmy Dunne
Keith Dunne
Robbie Dunne
Stephen Dunne
Tommy Dunne
Peter Durrad

E 
Karim El-Khebir

F 
Christy Fagan
Dave Fagan
Vinny Faherty
Keith Fahey
Tyson Farago
Kevin Farragher
Rory Feely
Pat Fenlon
Padraig Finnerty
Lorcan Fitzgerald
Glen Fitzpatrick
Luke Fitzpatrick
Curtis Fleming
Anthony Flood
John Flood
Pat Flynn
Jason Folarin
Colm Foley
Michael Foley
Derek Foran
Richie Foran
Chris Forrester
Keith Foy
David Freeman
Gints Freimanis
Lance Friesz
John Frost

G 
Robbie Gaffney
Sean Gannon
Martin Garratt
Graham Gartland
Owen Garvan
Stuart Gauld
Jason Gavin
Tommy Gaynor
Liam George
Shay Gibbons
Billy Gibson
Jordan Gibson
Rene Gilmartin
Ian Gilzean
John Glynn
Eddie Gormley
Jamie Gray
Aaron Greene
Eamonn Gregg
Shane Griffin
Tom Grivosti
Kevin Grogan
Steven Grogan
Cyril Guedjé
Shane Guthrie
Ryan Guy

H 
Alfie Hale
Ronan Hale
Ben Hannigan
Andy Haran
Neil Harney
Allan Harris
Jamie Harris
Jimmy Harris
Evan Harte
Joe Haverty
Noel Haverty
Colin Hawkins
Luke Heeney
Dave Henderson
Jackie Hennessy
Jak Hickman
Fran Hitchcock
Sean Hoare
Matt Holland
Brandon Holt
Michael Holt
Peter Hopkins
Robbie Horgan
Cian Hughes
Philip Hughes
Paul Hunt
Eoin Hyland

J 
Jackie Jameson
Vítězslav Jaroš
Pat Jennings
Jimmy-Lee Jones

K 
Conor Kane
Daryl Kavanagh
Michael Keane
Mick Kearin
Conor Kearns
Jake Keegan
Jordan Keegan
Paul Keegan
Josh Keeley
Dermot Keely
Aidan Keena
Pat Kelch
Cian Kelly
Ciaran Kelly
Dean Kelly
Georgie Kelly
Graham Kelly
Jake Kelly
Liam Kelly
Seamus Kelly
Tommy Kelly
Conor Kenna
Stephen Kenny
Shay Keogh
Ciarán Kilduff
Billy King
Steven Kinsella
Alan Kirby
Aime Kitenge
Paul Knight
Vladislav Kreida

L 
Morgan Langley
Niall Lanigan
Glen Atle Larsen
Joe Lawless
Michael Leahy
Mark Leech
Mick Leech
Brenton Leister
Jamie Lennon
John Lester
Alfie Lewis
Noah Lewis
Darius Lipsiuc
Tommy Lonergan
Keith Long
Dinny Lowry
Jonathan Lunney
Damian Lynch
Eamonn Lynch
Lee Lynch
Packie Lynch

M 
Michal Macek
Sean Madden
Simon Madden
Darragh Maguire
Anthony Maher
Brian Maher
Ian Maher
Stephen Maher
Conor Mahoney
Ian Malone
Joe Manley
Brendan Markey
Darragh Markey
Paul Marney
Neil Martin
Hernany Macedo Marques
Charles Livingstone Mbabazi
David McAllister
Rhys McCabe
Jason McClelland
Gerry McCord
Ben McCormack
Conor McCormack
John McDonnell
Shane McEleney
Christy McElligott
Shane McFaul
Paul McGee
Dylan McGlade
Brian McGovern
Jamie McGrath
Jay McGrath
Paul McGrath
Dara McGuinness
Jason McGuinness
Stephen McGuinness
Dan McHale
Sean McHale
Brian McKenna
David McMillan
Evan McMillan
Luke McNally
Gary McPhee
Darren Meenan
Mason Melia
Nahum Melvin-Lambert
Brandon Miele
George Miller
Trevor Molloy
Mick Moody
John Moore
Kyle Moran
Thomas Morgan
Ian Morris
Brian Morrisroe
John Mountney
David Mulcahy
Adam Murphy
Anthony Murphy
Mark Mulraney
Tom Mulroney
Barry Murphy (born 1959)
Barry Murphy (born 1985)
Conor Murphy
John Murphy
Tzee Mustapha

N 
Joseph N'Do
Paul Newe
Danny North
Kyrian Nwoko

O 
Declan O'Brien
Derek O'Brien
Ger O'Brien
Luke O'Brien
James O'Brien
Gay O'Carroll
Joe O'Cearuill
Adam O'Connor
David O'Connor
Garreth O'Connor
John O'Connor
Sean O'Connor
Tony O'Connor
Paul O'Conor
Tony O'Dowd
David Odumosu
Richie O'Farrell
Ricky O'Flaherty
Stephen O'Flynn
Alex O'Hanlon
Josh O'Hanlon
Aidan O'Keeffe
Eamonn O'Keefe
Darren O'Keeffe
Conor O'Malley
Ken Oman
Frank O'Neill
Gary O'Neill
Adam O'Reilly
Kevin O'Reilly
Paul Osam
Ben O'Sullivan
Tunde Owolabi

P 
Stephen Paisley
David Parkes
David Partridge
Gavin Peers
Derek Pender
Conor Pepper
Derek Possee
Georgie Poynton
Barry Prenderville
Aidan Price

Q 
Mark Quigley
Stephen Quigley
Ciaran Quinn
Stephen Quinn

R 
Joe Redmond
Martin Rennie
Alan Reilly
Martin Reilly
Kyle Robinson
Lee Roche
Danny Rogers
Dave Rogers
Gary Rogers
Fran Rooney
Mark Rooney
Paul Rooney
Paul Rose
Mark Rossiter
Ger Rowe
John Russell
Martin Russell
Mark Rutherford
Barry Ryan
Bobby Ryan
Darragh Ryan
David Ryan
John Ryan

S 
Luís Gabriel Sacilotto
Jack Scott
Anthony Shandran
Gary Shaw
Philip Sheppard
Brian Shortall
Conor Sinnott
Łukasz Skowron
Matty Smith
Alec Stephenson
Enda Stevens
Sean Stewart
Freddie Strahan
Fuad Sule

T 
Mark Timlin
Thijs Timmermans
David Titov
Kevin Toner
Danny Trainor
Keith Treacy
Paddy Turley
Ian Turner

V 
Terry Venables
Sam Verdon

W 
Jake Walker
Dan Ward
David Webster
Jamie Whelan
Ronnie Whelan
Alex Williams
Trevor Wood
Dominique Wouters

Y 
Ollie Younger

 
Association football player non-biographical articles
St Patricks's